The Ven.  Christopher Henry Gould Butson (19 April 1817 – 13 June 1892) was an Irish Anglican priest.

Butson was born in Dublin, the son of an Archdeacon of Clonfert, The Ven. James Strange Butson; and was educated at Trinity College, Dublin. He was the  Rector of Clontarf; himself Archdeacon of Clonfert from 1855 to 1874; and then the Dean of Kilmacduagh from 1874 until his death on 13 June 1892.

Notes

Alumni of Trinity College Dublin
Deans of Kilmacduagh
1892 deaths
1817 births
Christian clergy from Dublin (city)
People educated at Winchester College